Barton Street is a street in the Barton and Tredworth district of Gloucester that is the location of a number of listed buildings:

 Church of all Saints
 110 and 112 Barton Street
 The Olympus Theatre
 The Vauxhall Inn

Barton Street elects a mock mayor.

References

External links 

Barton Street at british-history.ac.uk

Streets in Gloucester